Lafayette Elementary School District is a public school district based in Contra Costa County, California, United States.

Schools

Elementary 

 Burton Valley Elementary
 Happy Valley Elementary
 Lafayette Elementary
 Spring Hill Elementary

Middle 

 Stanley Middle School

References

External links
 

School districts in Contra Costa County, California